Boikov, female Boikova is a surname. Notable people with the surname include:

 Alexandre Boikov (born 1975), Russian ice hockey defenseman
 Alexander Boikov (born 1975), Russian ice hockey forward
 Aleksandra Boikova
 Sergei Boikov

Russian-language surnames